BMC Otomotiv Sanayi ve Ticaret A.Ş., doing business as BMC Otomotive and BMC, is one of the largest automobile manufacturers in Turkey. Its products include commercial trucks, buses, military trucks and armoured vehicles. The company was founded in 1964 by Ergün Özakat in partnership of British Motor Corporation which held a 26% stake. It was purchased by Çukurova Holding in 1989, and seized by the Turkish government's TMSF (Turkish Savings Deposit Insurance Fund) in 2013. BMC has been taken over with a final bid of TL 751M, by a partnership of 51% Turkish side (Ethem Sancak and Talip Öztürk) and 49% Qatari side (QAFIC – Qatar Armed Forces Industry Committee).

History

Partnership with British Motor Corporation
Exports of Austin trucks from the UK to Turkey began in 1947. Austin merged with Morris Motors in 1952 to form the British Motor Corporation, or BMC for short. BMC Turkey was formed in 1964 in İzmir by Ergün Özakat in partnership with the British Motor Corporation. The UK-based company held 26% of the capital, with the remainder belonging to the Turkish partners. Both Austin and Morris vehicles were manufactured at BMC Turkey under licence during its early years.

1966 was the first year BMC started adding truck, light truck, tractor and engine production in its product line.

Other partnerships

In later years, BMC evolved and developed other models with partnerships with other firms and the successors of the British Motor Corporation (which became British Leyland).

First, the Leyland 30 was released into the market as the first full-size van.

In 1983, under a partnership with Volvo Trucks, BMC produced the Yavuz series trucks. These were followed by the Fatih series of trucks which offered Cummins diesel engines. Both the Yavuz and the Fatih used Leyland's old G-series cab, also referred to as the "Redline" or the "Bathgate" cab (after the plant where it was originally built).

Çukurova (1989–2013)
In 1989 the company was fully acquired by the Çukurova Group of Turkey. From that moment on, BMC started to produce its own indigenous product line, independent of other manufacturers.

In 1996, BMC started the production of the Profesyonel series, which are produced in Turkey and (since 2004) under licence in Iran. A modernized version of the Profesyonel is sold as the "Professional".

BMC also produces buses as part of the Belde series (since 1993) and Probus series. There is a small truck line called the "Levend", with either a cabover or a short bonneted design. This is a locally built version of the Leyland Sherpa/LDV Pilot. Its chassis is also used for the Levend XL and XLC minibuses.

Since 2000, BMC exports trucks and buses to numerous countries around the world. When exports to the United Kingdom began in 2003, this marked the return to the UK of the BMC brand name, not seen on British roads since the 1960s.

The 2.8 litre MegaStar is built in İzmir (Turkey) by BMC, production started in 2004.

TMSF (2013–2014)
TMSF has taken over the company in 2013, produced Kirpi MRAPs and completed the deliveries. After the Kirpi deliveries are completed, then TMSF put the company out to tender, which has been won by Es Mali Yatırım.

Present-day (2014–)
Currently, BMC is actively designing, developing and realizing mass production of its products. Its research and development activities are being carried out independently.

2800+ staff are working for BMC while 500+ of them are engineers. Today BMC are about to start the mass production of 250 units of Altay Turkish Main Battle Tank, designing indigenous engines for tanks and armoured vehicles, and 8x8 Armoured Personnel Carriers. BMC has also a partnership of design and mass production of domestic passenger car. BMC is also active in rail systems. BMC produces 6x6 & 4x4 Kirpi MRAP vehicles.

In 2018 2nd generation of Kirpi, the Kirpi-2 is introduced. Lightly armored than Kirpi, Amazon is introduced in 2015. BMC produces military trucks; beginning from 8x8 tank transporter, 6x6 10 tonners, 4x4 5 tonners up to 2,5 tonners. These utility trucks can be equipped with any superstructure (water/fuel tanker, command control/shelter, rocket launcher, mobile repair/maintenance, recovery crane, etc.) and gain required role. Other specialized military vehicles are also being produced like Riot Control Vehicles or Hidden Armored Buses (looks like a soft skin commercial bus from the outside).

Other than wide variety of military vehicles, BMC has also various different commercial vehicles as well. Buses starting from 8,5m, 9m, 10m, 12m, up to 18m articulated buses and 14m airport apron buses is on mass production with three engine selections: diesel, CNG, and electric.

Commercial trucks having engines with Euro6 engine emission levels with various different models are also on product range. Tractors, construction and haulage trucks with many different engine, transmission and cabin selection are presented to market.

BMC produced 400.000+ vehicles until today, while exported its commercial to 80 different countries including England, Spain, Italy, Russia and its military vehicles to 16 countries.

BMC Vehicles

Military vehicles 
BMC designs, develops and produces various different military vehicles. Other than its standard products, BMC has the capability of designing every different vehicle according to end user requirements out of its extensive engineering experiences.

Armoured vehicles 
 Kirpi MRAP
 Vuran MPAV
 Amazon MPAV
 METİ (EOD vehicle)
 Tulga pickup

Tactical wheeled vehicles 
 8x8 Tank transporter
 6x6 10 tonner
 4x4 5 tonner
 4x4 2,5 tonner

Logistic support vehicles 
 Water tanker
 Fuel tanker 
 Armored fuel tanker Aktan
 Recovery vehicle
 Container carrier
 Rocket launcher
 Repair/Maintenance vehicle 
BMC Tugra

Security vehicles 
 Hidden armored bus
 Riot control vehicle

Commercial vehicles 
BMC produces every variation of urban buses for commercial transportation with 3 different engine selection (diesel, CNG, electric) including 18m articulated bus. BMC also produces apron buses for airport uses.

Commercial buses
 Neocity 8,5m, 9m ,10m, Diesel, Electric, Cng 
 Procity 12m, 18m, Diesel, Cng 
 14m Neoport Airport Apron Bus

Commercial trucks
BMC produces various different commercial trucks for commercial transport uses with different transmission and cabin selection. Emission level of the engines of the trucks are Euro6.

 4x2 Long haulage
 6x2 Long haulage (with bed)
 8x2 Long haulage
 4x2 Tractor (high roof, robotic shift)
 4x2 Tractor (standard roof, robotic shift)
 6x4 Construction
 8x4 Construction

Vehicles under development
BMC has the capability to develop state of the art, cutting-edge technology vehicles according to end user requirements.

 8x8 Tank transporter (prototype already manufactured)
 8x8 Armored personnel carrier (APC)
 Armored SUV (various different variants)
 Şahin 4x4 Light armored vehicle

Altay Main Battle Tank  
Altay is the modern Turkish main battle tank, named after General Fahrettin Altay, who commanded the 5th Cavalry Corps during the Turkish War of Independence. In 2018, BMC won the tender for 250 units of Altay tanks to be utilized by Turkish Army.

BMC Power 

In 2017, up to 700 HP engines for new generation armoured vehicles contract is signed between BMC and SSB. In 2018, 1800 HP indigenous tank engine for Altay Main Battle Tank contract is once again signed between BMC and SSB. Other than these two contracts, BMC will also be developing engines up to 5000 HP for the naval industry as well.

BMC Rail Systems 
BMC is planning to produce rail and metro train wagons. In this regard, BMC and Swiss Stadler formed a joint venture partnership.

Design 
The BMC Profesyonel and BMC Megastar models are designed by Pininfarina.

References

External links

 Official Website

Bus manufacturers of Turkey
Truck manufacturers of Turkey
Defence companies of Turkey
Vehicle manufacturing companies established in 1964
Turkish brands